Verner Lindberg (17 August 1852 – 10 February 1909) was a Finnish politician born in Sund, Sweden. He was an engineer and member of the Senate of Finland.

Education
Lindberg attended the Helsinki University of Technology from 1868 to 1872 and the Polytechnic Institute 1872–1874.

Professional life
From 1874 to 1878 Lindberg worked as an engineer for the national railway.  He progressed through the ranks of civil engineer, starting as a junior engineer 1881–1892, senior engineer 1892–1893 and supervisor 1893–1906.

Lindberg was a member of the Senate Finance Committee and Maritime Administration Manager from 1908 to 1909.

Personal life
Lindberg was a child of Karl Fredrik Lindberg and Johanna Margareta Öhman. In 1884, Lindberg married Emma Maria Souranderin.

19th-century Finnish politicians
Finnish senators
1852 births
1909 deaths